Changing Horses may refer to:

 Changing Horses (Incredible String Band album), 1969
 Changing Horses (Ben Kweller album), 2009